Schroer is a surname. Notable people with the surname include:

Bert Schroer (born 1933), German mathematical physicist
Nick Schroer, American politician
Oliver Schroer (1956–2008), Canadian musician

See also
Schröer